Cezayirli Gazi Hasan Pasha or Hasan Pasha of Algiers (1713 – 19 March 1790) was an Ottoman Grand Admiral (Kapudan Pasha) (1770–90), Grand Vizier (1790), and general in the late 18th century.

Primary life 
He is known to have been brought up as a Georgian slave in western Anatolia by a Turkish merchant of Tekirdağ, who raised him in that city considering him on a par with his own sons.

Career 
He rose through the ranks of the Ottoman military hierarchy and was for a time with the Barbary Coast pirates based in Algiers (whence his name Cezayirli, meaning "from Algiers" in Turkish). He was a fleet commander during the Battle of Chesme aboard the Real Mustafa and was able to extract the forces under his command from the general disaster for the Turkish navy that occurred there. He arrived at the Ottoman capital with the bad news, but was highly praised for his own accomplishment and promoted, first to chief of staff and later to grand vizier. He dislodged the Russian fleet which had established a base on the Aegean island of Lemnos.

Anecdotal evidence indicates that, immediately after the defeat at Chesme, he and his men were lodged by a local priest in Ayvalık who did not know who they were. Hasan Pasha did not forget the kindness shown at that hour of crisis and later accorded virtual autonomy to the Greek-dominated town of Ayvalık, paving the way for its becoming an important cultural center for that community in the Ottoman Empire in the 19th century.

The defeat also prompted Hasan Pasha to establish the Naval Engineering Golden Horn Shipyard (later Turkish Naval Academy) in 1773.

Hasan Pasha blockaded Acre in the summer of 1775 in order to check the power of the autonomous Arab ruler of Palestine, Zahir al-Umar. Hasan Pasha ordered Zahir to pay 50,000 piasters to relieve the siege. Zahir ultimately refused and consequently, Hasan Pasha's ships bombarded Acre, but the Ottoman Empire manning Acre's cannons refused Zahir's orders to fire back at the ships and intentionally directed their fire away from Hasan Pasha's naval forces. Their loyalty to the Ottoman sultan precluded them from firing on his military. Zahir fled, but was killed by Hasan Pasha's troops before he could escape.

In 1786, Hasan Pasha was ordered by the sultan Abdülhamid I to take troops to Egypt and drive out the Mamluk emirs led by Ibrahim Bey (Mamluk) and Murad Bey, who had become de facto rulers of the province. He arrived in Egypt in early August 1786 and was successful in this campaign (although the Mamluk emirs would regain power after his death) and remained the de facto Ottoman governor of Egypt for around a year. His long-time kethüda (assistant/deputy) Ismail Pasha the Tripolitanian remained in Egypt and was soon appointed the Ottoman governor of Egypt himself (1788–89, 1789–91) while his allied Mamluk emir Ismail Bey became the Shaykh al-Balad and de facto ruler.

In the Russo-Turkish War of 1787-1792, Hasan Pasha (then 74) commanded the Turkish troops in the beginning campaigns, taking part in the action of 17 June 1788, the Battle of Fidonisi, and the Siege of Ochakov.

Death 
He died on 19 March 1790, from illness or perhaps poisoned. His statue today graces the resort town of Çeşme, along with the lion that he domesticated while in Africa and took along with him everywhere.

See also
Cezayirli Hasan Paşa Monument

References

 Isipek Ali Rıza and Aydemir Oguz (2010) Battle of Çesme 1770. 1768-1774 Ottoman - Russian Wars, Istanbul, Denizler Kitabevi,

Sources
 Nuttall Encyclopedia: 
 World Statesman: Turkey – Grand Viziers
 J.H. Mordtmann, in E.J. Brill's first encyclopaedia of Islam, 1913–36, Volume 2, p 1039 
 

1713 births
1790 deaths
18th-century Ottoman governors of Egypt
18th-century Grand Viziers of the Ottoman Empire
18th-century slaves
Pashas
Kapudan Pashas
Georgians from the Ottoman Empire
Ottoman governors of Egypt
Slaves from the Ottoman Empire